Lyudmila Chernova (born 30 November 1955) is a Russian sprinter. She competed in the women's 400 metres at the 1980 Summer Olympics.

References

1955 births
Living people
Athletes (track and field) at the 1980 Summer Olympics
Russian female sprinters
Olympic athletes of the Soviet Union
Place of birth missing (living people)
Soviet female sprinters
Olympic female sprinters